European Prize for Women Innovators (formerly European Woman Innovator of the Year) is a prize awarded by the European Union.

Laureates

2021 
 1st: Rebecca Saive, Germany
 2nd: Mathilde Jakobsen, Denmark
 3rd: Daphne Haim Langford, Israel
 youth prize: Ailbhe Keane and Ailbhe Keane, Ireland
 Special mention prize for their achievements:
 In the main category: Asude Altıntaş, Turkey
 In the Rising Innovator category: Livia Ng, UK

2020 
 1st: Madiha Derouazi, Switzerland
 2nd: Maria Fatima Lucas, Portugal
 3rd: Arancha Martinez, Spain
 youth prize: Josefien Groot, Netherlands
 Special mention prize for their achievements:
 In the main category: Cécile Real (France)
 In the Rising Innovator category:
 Ailbhe Keane (Ireland)
 Rebecca Saive (Germany),

2019 
 1st: Irina Borodina, Lithuania
 2nd: Martine Caroff, France
 3rd: Shimrit Perkol-Finkel, Israel
 youth prize: Michela Puddu, Italy

2018 
 1st: Gabriella Colucci, Italy
 2nd: Alicia Asín Pérez, Spain
 3rd: Walburga Fröhlich, Austria
 youth prize: Karen Dolva, Norway

2017 
 1st: Michela Magas, Croatia/ UK
 2nd: Petra Wadström, Sweden
 3rd: Claudia Gärtner, Germany
 youth prize: Kristina Tsvetanova, Bulgaria.

2016 
 1st: Susana Sargento, Portugal
 2nd:Sirpa Jalkanen, Finland
 3rd: Sarah Bourke, Ireland

2014 
 1st: Saskia Biskup, Germany
 2nd: Laura van 't Veer Netherlands
 3rd: Ana Maiques

2011 
 1st: Gitte Neubauer, Germany
 2nd: Fabienne Hermitte, France
 3rd: Ilaria Rosso, Italy

References 

Orders, decorations, and medals of the European Union
Awards established in 2014
Awards honoring women